Henry B. Krajewski (July 15, 1912 – November 8, 1966) was an American politician who ran for the United States Presidency in 1952 (for the Poor Man's Party) and in 1956 (for the American Third Party). He was also an American Third Party candidate for the United States Senate from New Jersey in 1954. He also ran for New Jersey Governor three times, in 1953 (Jersey Veterans Bonus), 1957 (American Third Party), and 1961 (Veterans Bonus Now).

Biography
Born in Jersey City, New Jersey, Krajewski had an imposing stature; he stood six foot (1.83 m) and weighed 240 pounds (109 kg). In 1952, he owned and ran a 4,000-pig farm in Secaucus, New Jersey. With printing-press operator Frank Jenkins as his running mate, his platform included a one-year tax moratorium for every taxpayer with an annual income below $6,000, and one free pint of milk a day in school for every child. He won 4,203 votes. In 1956, Krajewski's running mate was Anna Yezo, he got 1,829 votes.

See also
 Jeff Boss
 Ed Forchion

References 

 
 

1912 births
1966 deaths
Politicians from Jersey City, New Jersey
People from Secaucus, New Jersey
Candidates in the 1952 United States presidential election
Candidates in the 1956 United States presidential election
20th-century American politicians